Račje Selo is a village north of Trebnje in eastern Slovenia. The area is part of the historical region of Lower Carniola. The municipality is now included in the Southeast Slovenia Statistical Region.

Name
The name Račje selo developed from the phrase *Radęťe selo 'Radę's village', thus referring to an early inhabitant of the place. The Slovene name is not connected with raca 'duck' or rak 'crab', which also form the adjective račji. In the past, the village was known as Rappelgeschieß in German. The German name is a compound; the first part refers to a Count Rapoto or Rappold attested in the area in 1062, probably shortened from Radebald and also the source of the Slovene name *Radę. The second part of the German name means 'seat, possession' (cf. German Gesitze 'domicile, dwelling'), thus 'Radebald's possession'.

Church
The local church is dedicated to Saint Florian and belongs to the Parish of Trebnje. It dates to the 16th century with some 17th-century modifications.

References

External links

Račje Selo at Geopedia

Populated places in the Municipality of Trebnje